Ron Labadie (born April 7, 1949) is an American football scout and former player and coach. He has been a scout for the Miami Dolphins of the National Football League (NFL) since 1990. Labadie was the head football coach at Adrian College in Adrian, Michigan for eight seasons, from 1982 to 1989, compiling a record of 53–21.

Head coaching record

College

References

1949 births
Living people
Adrian Bulldogs athletic directors
Adrian Bulldogs football coaches
Adrian Bulldogs football players
Miami Dolphins scouts
High school football coaches in Michigan
People from Van Buren County, Michigan
Coaches of American football from Michigan
Players of American football from Michigan